Over Drive is a 2018 Japanese sports drama film. The film stars Masahiro Higashide, Mackenyu Arata, Aoi Morikawa, Takumi Kitamura, Keita Machida, Jun Kaname and Kōtarō Yoshida.

Cast
 Masahiro Higashide as Atsuhiro Hiyama
 Mackenyu Arata as Naozumi Hiyama
 Aoi Morikawa as Hikaru Endo
 Takumi Kitamura as Akira Shinkai
 Keita Machida as Junpei Masuda
 Jun Kaname as Hisatoshi Kagawa
 Kōtarō Yoshida as Issei Tsuzuki
 Maxwell Powers as the race announcer

Awards and nominations

References

External links
 

2018 drama films
2010s Japanese-language films
Japanese auto racing films
Japanese sports drama films
Films about brothers
Films set in Malaysia
Films set in India
Films set in Tokyo
Films set in Toyama Prefecture
Films set in Kitakyushu
Films set in Gunma Prefecture
Films shot in Tokyo
Films shot in Toyama Prefecture
Films shot in Kitakyushu
Films shot in Gunma Prefecture
Films shot in Shizuoka Prefecture
Films shot in Nagasaki Prefecture
Films shot in Yamaguchi Prefecture
Toho films
2010s Japanese films